LMS diesel shunter 7053 carried its original number of 7403 only within the Hunslet Engine Company's works, and was delivered as LMS number 7053. It was of almost exactly the same size and shape as LMS diesel shunter 7052, but had different internal fittings. It was loaned to the War Department between 1939-1942, which numbered it 23. Immediately upon return to the LMS, in December 1942, it was withdrawn from stock and sold back to Hunslet. No further use was found for it and it was eventually dismantled during the mid-1950s.

References

See also
 LMS diesel shunters

7053
Diesel shunter 7053
War Department locomotives
Hunslet locomotives
C locomotives
Railway locomotives introduced in 1934
Standard gauge locomotives of Great Britain
Scrapped locomotives